The 2021 American Athletic Conference softball tournament will be held at the Collins Family Softball Complex on the campus of the University of Tulsa in Tulsa, Oklahoma from May 13 through May 15, 2021. The tournament winner earned the American Athletic Conference's automatic bid to the 2021 NCAA Division I softball tournament.

The 2019 Tournament was canceled due to weather, while the 2020 Tournament was canceled because of the COVID-19 pandemic, meaning that no champion had been crowned since 2018.  Entering the 2021 event, Tulsa had won three titles, while UCF had won once.

Tournament

Bracket

Game schedule

References

Tournament
American Athletic Conference softball tournament
AAC softball tournament
Softball in Oklahoma